Touliao Mausoleum or Daxi Mausoleum is the resting place for Republic of China President Chiang Ching-Kuo located in Daxi District, Taoyuan City, Taiwan.

History

The Mausoleum building was originally known as the "Touliao guesthouse" and was constructed by RSEA Engineering and completed on July 17, 1966. The building's function was later changed to the presidential palace archives, and then to the Chiang family collection of information.

When Chiang Ching-Kuo died on January 13, 1988, preparations were made to bring his body here for interment on January 30. The name of the building was subsequently renamed to Daxi Mausoleum.

On January 13, 2001, the Taoyuan County Cultural Affairs Bureau announced the Mausoleum as a regional historic building. In 2006, the Taoyuan County government combined the Jiaobanshan villa, Cihu Presidential Burial Place, and Touliao Mausoleum into the "Chiang's Cultural Park". The Touliao Mausoleum building is about one kilometer from the Cihu Presidential Burial Place building. The two places are now linked by a footpath.

In 2004, a request was made to move Chiang Ching-kuo's remains, along with those of his father, Chiang Kai-shek to Wuzhi Mountain Military Cemetery for interment in newly built tombs there. However, political disputes held up the reinterment process. As of 2016, the reinterment has not occurred.

See also
 Ching-kuo Memorial Hall
 Chiang Ching-kuo Memorial Hall
 Sun Yat-sen Mausoleum
 Cihu Mausoleum
 Wuzhi Mountain Military Cemetery
 Chen Tsyr-shiou Memorial Park (Former Tomb and Memorial Museum of Chen Cheng, demolished in 1995)
 Mausoleum of Mao Zedong

References

External links
 

1966 establishments in Taiwan
Buildings and structures completed in 1966
Buildings and structures in Taoyuan City
Mausoleums in Taiwan
Tourist attractions in Taoyuan City